Herbert Peter Bayley (9 April 191629 December 1996) was a first-class cricketer from British Guiana who toured with the West Indian cricket team in England in 1939.

His highest score was 268 for British Guiana against Barbados in 1937–38.

His uncle was fellow cricketer Benjamin Bayley.

References

External links

1916 births
1996 deaths
Sportspeople from Georgetown, Guyana
Guyanese cricketers
Guyana cricketers